Jeffery Glenn Branson (born January 26, 1967) is an American former Major League Baseball infielder who is a Major League Baseball coach.  He was the assistant hitting coach for the Pittsburgh Pirates in 2013 and the hitting coach from 2014 until 2018. He is currently the hitting coach for the Toledo Mud Hens

Early and personal life
Branson was born on January 26, 1967, in Waynesboro, Mississippi.  He is an alumnus of Southern Choctaw High School in Silas, Alabama, and the University of West Alabama.  He was drafted by the Cincinnati Reds in the second round of the 1988 MLB amateur draft.

Career
Branson played for three different teams during his playing career: the Cincinnati Reds (1992–1997), Cleveland Indians (1997–1998), and Los Angeles Dodgers (2000–2001). He made his Major League Baseball debut April 12, 1992 and played his final game October 6, 2001.

Coaching career
On November 18, 2013, Branson was named hitting coach of the Pittsburgh Pirates. He was previously the assistant hitting coach in 2013. He was relieved of this position on October 1, 2018.

External links

1967 births
Living people
Albuquerque Dukes players
People from Waynesboro, Mississippi
Baseball players from Mississippi
Buffalo Bisons (minor league) players
Cedar Rapids Reds players
Chattanooga Lookouts players
Cincinnati Reds players
Cleveland Indians players
Indianapolis Indians players
Las Vegas 51s players
Los Angeles Dodgers players
Major League Baseball hitting coaches
Major League Baseball infielders
Minor league baseball managers
Nashville Sounds players
Pittsburgh Pirates coaches
West Alabama Tigers baseball players
Medalists at the 1988 Summer Olympics
Olympic gold medalists for the United States in baseball
Olympic medalists in baseball
Baseball players at the 1988 Summer Olympics